Eupatorium paniculatum is a taxonomic synonym that may refer to:

Eupatorium paniculatum  = Brenandendron donianum
Eupatorium paniculatum  = Brickellia paniculata

References